The 1923–24 season was the 49th season of competitive football in England, with Huddersfield Town becoming League Champions for the first time, managing to beat Cardiff City in the closest finish in the competition's history, having the same number of points and winning the title by just 0.024 on goal average.

Overview
On 11 November 1923, Aston Villa centre-half Tommy Ball was shot dead by his neighbour, thus becoming the only Football League player to have been murdered.

Honours

Football League

First Division

Second Division

Third Division North

Third Division South

Top goalscorers

First Division
Wilf Chadwick (Everton) – 28 goals

Second Division
Harry Bedford (Blackpool) – 34 goals

Third Division North
David Brown (Darlington) – 27 goals

Third Division South
Willie Haines (Portsmouth) – 28 goals

References